K. Venu may refer to:

 K. Venu (Kerala), Naxalite leader from Kerala, see Central Reorganisation Committee, Communist Party of India (Marxist-Leninist)
 K. Venu (Tamil Nadu politician), politician from Tamil Nadu